Vaughn Morton Stewart III (born November 15, 1988) is an American attorney and politician. He is a member of the Maryland House of Delegates, representing District 19 in Montgomery County since 2019.

Early life and education 
Stewart was born on November 15, 1988, in Anniston, Alabama. He graduated from The Donoho School and later attended the University of Pennsylvania, where he earned a bachelor's degree in political science in 2011, and New York University, where he earned a Juris Doctor degree in 2014. During law school, Stewart interned for the United States Domestic Policy Council in the Obama administration. In 2015, he served as policy director for Jamie Raskin's first congressional campaign.

Career 
As an attorney, Stewart worked for WilmerHale, a multinational law firm based in Washington, D.C. Stewart also worked on pro bono matters, providing legal assistance to refugees.

Prior to being elected delegate, Stewart served as Treasurer and precinct chairperson of the District 19 Democratic Club. Stewart has served on the boards of the Action Committee for Transit and the Montgomery County Renters Alliance.

In August 2017, Stewart declared his candidacy for the Maryland House of Delegates in District 19. He came in third place in the Democratic primary, receiving 16.9 percent of the vote. He won the general election with 24 percent of the vote.

In the legislature 
Stewart was sworn into the Maryland General Assembly on January 9, 2019.

In 2022, House Speaker Adrienne A. Jones appointed Stewart to lead the newly created "Progressive Policy Forum" within the House Democratic Caucus.

In 2023, Jones appointed Stewart as one of two Chief Majority Whips for the Maryland House of Delegates.

Committee assignments
 Member, Environment and Transportation Committee, 2019–present (environment subcommittee, 2019–present; motor vehicle & transportation subcommittee, 2019; land use & ethics subcommittee, 2020–present)

Other memberships
 Member, Maryland Legislative Latino Caucus, 2019–present
 Member, Maryland Legislative Transit Caucus, 2019–present

Personal life 
Stewart is married to Alexandra Tucker Stewart, an attorney at WilmerHale. Together, they live in Derwood, Maryland and have one child.

Stewart is a two-time cancer survivor. He was diagnosed with salivary gland cancer in 2007 and non-Hodgkin's lymphoma in 2017. Both cancers have since gone into remission.

Political positions

Health care
In between chemotherapy treatments, Stewart studied health care policy. He supports proposals to regulate prescription drug manufacturers like public utilities and to create a statewide universal health care system.

Housing
Stewart introduced legislation during the 2019 legislative session that would increase affordable housing units and condominiums. The bill would ease zoning restrictions for high-density housing, introduce new real-estate transaction fees to fund public housing projects, and allow tenants to terminate leases in cases of unsafe housing or harassment by landlords. The bill was reintroduced during the 2020 and 2022 legislative sessions.

In March 2019, Stewart voted in favor of legislation that would require landlords to give a reason for evicting a tenant. The bill was rejected by the House Environment and Transportation Committee in a 2-17 vote.

Stewart introduced legislation during the 2021 legislative session that requires landlords that own properties that use well water to test for a series of contaminants every three years.

Stewart introduced legislation during the 2022 legislative session that would delay an eviction when a tenant can prove they have applied for rental assistance. The bill passed both chambers. He also introduced the "Tenant Protection Act of 2022", which establishes rules and procedures for landlords who give tenants ratio utility bills. The bill passed both chambers and became law without the governor's signature.

Immigration
Stewart introduced the "Dignity Not Detention Act" during the 2021 legislative session, which prohibits jurisdictions from contracting with U.S. Immigration and Customs Enforcement to detain undocumented people in local jails. The bill passed, but was vetoed by Governor Larry Hogan. The Legislature voted to override Hogan's veto on December 7, 2021.

Marijuana
In 2018, Vaughn said that he supports the legalization of marijuana.

Minimum wage
Stewart co-sponsored legislation introduced during the 2019 legislative session that would raise the state's minimum wage to $15 an hour.

Social issues
Stewart introduced legislation in the 2020 legislative session to create a multi-state compact to end corporate tax breaks aimed at getting businesses aimed to move across state lines.

In February 2020, Stewart co-sponsored legislation that would investigate the possibility of distributing reparations to the descendants of enslaved Africans.

Stewart introduced legislation during the 2022 legislative session that would prohibit the Governor of Maryland from using apps that automatically destroy text messages. He also introduced legislation that would amend the Constitution of Maryland to set up an ombudsman elected position in Maryland, which would "receive, respond to, and investigate ethics complains" against state officials. The bill did not receive a committee vote.

In May 2022, Stewart attended a protest in Rockville, Maryland against the alleged mistreatment of hundreds of animals at Inotiv's Indiana drug toxicity lab.

Statewide and national politics
During the 2020 presidential election, Stewart ran to be a national delegate at the Democratic National Convention pledged to Bernie Sanders.

During the 2022 primaries in Maryland, Stewart endorsed Tom Perez for Governor, Brooke Lierman for Comptroller, and Katie O'Malley for Attorney General.

Transportation
Stewart supports increasing funding for monorail projects, including a proposal that would build a 27-mile monorail line between Shady Grove and Frederick, Maryland.

Stewart introduced legislation during the 2019 legislative session that would increase the minimum fine against drivers who fail to yield to a pedestrian to $150, with fines larger than the minimum amount going toward improving pedestrian safety. The bill passed and became law. He also introduced legislation that would require state-funded highway projects or projects built through public-private partnerships to go through environmental studies.

Electoral history

References 

Maryland socialists
Democratic Party members of the Maryland House of Delegates
Democratic Socialists of America politicians from Maryland
1989 births
People from Anniston, Alabama
University of Pennsylvania alumni
New York University School of Law alumni
Living people
21st-century American politicians